Chan Ho Yin (born 25 February 1978 in Hong Kong) is a Hong Kong football coach and a former professional football player.

Career
Chan was a member of Hong Kong U-21 in 1990, participating in Gothia Cup and Dana Cup.

For his club career, he played for Kui Tan and Kitchee.

Coaching career
After his retirement from football, he started his managerial career as an assistant coach of Hong Kong U-21.

Tai Po
In the 2008–09 season, he was appointed as the head coach of Hong Kong First Division League club Wofoo Tai Po, leading the club climbing on the top of the table in October. He was also appointed as the head coach of Hong Kong League XI participating in 2009 Lunar New Year Cup.

Tai Chung
He joined another First Division club Tai Chung in July 2009. Although he helped the club avoid relegation to the Second Division, he was sacked as he breached the rule of game on 16 May 2010 against South China, which caused the club awarded a 0–3 loss. The match was originally ended with a 1–1 draw.

South China
He joined defending champions South China as an assistant coach in July 2010. Due to the resignation of head coach Kim Pan-Gon, he was appointed as the acting head coach. However, although having Nicky Butt and Mateja Kežman, South China failed to defend their league title, and were knocked out in the group stage of 2011 AFC Cup. He remained at the club as the assistant coach in the 2011–12 season.

Pegasus
Fellow First Division club Sun Pegasus appointed Chan as the head coach of the following season in June 2012. However, due to their recent poor form, Chan was sacked on 10 October.

Yuen Long
After being sacked by Sun Pegasus, Chan joined Hong Kong Second Division club Yuen Long as their head coach. He managed the club to gain promotion to the First Division as Yuen Long claimed the league title.

Pegasus
Chan returned to Pegasus, agreeing to terms on 16 January 2016 to be an assistant coach.

Following the termination of Pedro Garcia, Chan agreed to return as head coach of Pegasus on 30 September 2018.

References

1978 births
Living people
Hong Kong First Division League players
Hong Kong football managers
South China AA managers
TSW Pegasus FC managers
Kitchee SC players
Hong Kong people
Association footballers not categorized by position
Hong Kong footballers